University Hospital Center Dr Dragiša Mišović or Clinical Hospital Center Dr Dragiša Mišović Dedinje, is a health facility of secondary level in Belgrade, that performs specialist health care in its hospitals and clinics.

It is based on modern principles of health care. It serves as a teaching facility of the University of Belgrade School of Medicine. It was established in 1930, and it is named after Dragiša Mišović, a pre–WWII communist and doctor.

History
History of Dr Dragiša Mišović Complex begins with 1920s. Former Society of Young Women Doctors gained a place near Dedinje from Georg Weifert. In 1930, by architectural design of Živan Nikolić, was built an object designed for Belgrade mistress' rest (today's Children Hospital for Pulmonary Diseases and Tuberculosis).

On 24 October 2009, a great fire accident occurred in central building of the Hospital Center, which interrupted a lot future operating of the center. Regardless, the main services are still active in emerged circumstances.

See also
 Healthcare in Serbia
 List of hospitals in Serbia

References

External links 
  

Hospital buildings completed in 1930
Hospitals in Serbia
Medical education in Serbia
Teaching hospitals
Hospitals established in the 1930s
Hospital Center
Savski Venac